Raymond Angry (sometimes referred to as Ray Angry) is an American keyboardist, record producer, and composer.

Biography 

Since the 1990s, Angry has contributed songs and played on many hit records. He wrote Christina Aguilera's "Slow Down Baby", Ja Rule's "Real Life Fantasy" and Melanie Fiona's "Priceless". He also played on records by Robbie Williams, Joss Stone and also toured with D'Angelo.

In 2010 he was the musical director for Off the Wall: A Michael Jackson Tribute. In 2013 he received a Grammy nomination as part of The Roots' record Undun.

On many occasions Angry collaborated with Cindy Blackman, Mike Mangini, Tom "Bones" Malone, David Gilmore, Betty Wright and James Poyser. He has also worked with Patti LaBelle, Louie Vega, Jeremiah, Mobb Deep, Peter Gallagher and Elliott Yamin. His nickname is "Mister Goldfinger".

In August 2020, Angry contributed to the live streamed recording of the singer Bilal's EP VOYAGE-19, created remotely during the COVID-19 pandemic lockdowns. It was released the following month with proceeds from its sales going to participating musicians in financial hardship from the pandemic.

Discography 

 1996 - Yolanda Adams Live in Washington
 2003 - Sandy Rivera - In the House
 2004 - Joss Stone - Mind Body & Soul
 2004 - Mick Jagger and Dave Stewart - Alfie
 2006 - Robbie Williams - Rudebox
 2006 - Christina Aguilera - Back to Basics
 2007 - Elliott Yamin - Elliott Yamin
 2007 - Mark Ronson - Version
 2008 - Taylor Dayne - Satisfied
 2009 - Melinda Doolittle - Coming Back to You
 2009 - Diane Birch - Bible Belt
 2009 - Melanie Fiona - The Bridge
 2010 - Daniel Merriweather - Love & War
 2010 - Miguel - All I Want Is You
 2010 - Chiara Civello - 7752
 2010 - Jaheim - Another Round
 2010 - The Roots - How I Got Over
 2011 - Dionne Warwick - Only Trust Your Heart
 2011 - Ayọ - Billie-Eve
 2011 - The Roots - Undun
 2011 - Nikki Jean - Pennies in a Jar
 2012 - Esperanza Spalding - Radio Music Society
 2012 - DJ Khaled - Kiss the Ring
 2012 - Joss Stone - The Soul Sessions Vol. 2
 2012 - Ja Rule - Pain Is Love 2
 2012 - Estelle - All of Me
 2013 - James Maddock - Another Life
 2013 - Elvis Costello and The Roots - Wise Up Ghost & Other Songs
 2013 - John Legend - Love in the Future
 2013 - Jaheim - Appreciation Day
 2014 - Dianne Reeves - Beautiful Day
 2014 - The Roots - …And Then You Shoot Your Cousin
 2017 - Steve Wilson Sit Back, Relax & Unwind
 2017 - Esperanza Spalding - Exposure
 2018 - Ray Angry - One

References

External links 
 Discogs.com

American male composers
21st-century American composers
Living people
21st-century American keyboardists
21st-century American male musicians
Year of birth missing (living people)